Siripuram may refer to:

Siripuram, Visakhapatnam, a locality in Visakhapatnam
Siripuram, Nalgonda district, a village in Nalgonda district, Telangana, India
Siripuram, Guntur district, a village in Guntur district, Andhra Pradesh, India
Siripuram, Srikakulam district, a village in Srikakulam district, Andhra Pradesh, India